Emir Ekşioğlu (born 9 June 1994) is a Turkish journalist and former a Huffington Post author. He has been introduced in the Times of Israel as "One of the Middle East's most successful journalists."

Biography 
Emir Ekşioğlu was born in Istanbul whose family is from Rize. He published articles in important institutions such as HuffPost, Independent, Times of India, Economic Times, Times of Israel, Jerusalem Post, U.S. News, Foreign Policy, Fortune, Tehran Times and was introduced as the youngest media boss thanks to some of his investments in Turkey. In 2016, he bought the Boxer Magazine, where he previously used to work, from Nikkei. He has done interviews with a lot of important people on an international level.

Eksioglu, also who is active in the field of international relations, works as an Ambassador for Switzerland-based Horasis, which is one of the most reputable think-tanks.

He hosted an award-winning radio show on TRT.

Huffington Post 
In 2016, he became author of the Huffington Post, referral by HuffPost founder Arianna Huffington.

2018 Turkish general election 
In the 2018 general elections, the Justice and Development Party applied for a candidacy for Hakkari MP. This nomination was welcomed in many newspapers in Iran, Pakistan and Israel, but it was not nominated by the party. In an interview with The Jerusalem Post, he stated that his candidacy was a give social message for the region and that he was not a member of any party.

References 

Journalists from Istanbul
Turkish radio presenters
People from Rize
Laz people
1994 births
Living people